Janice Elaine Maxwell (November 20, 1956 – February 11, 2018) was an American stage and television actress.  She was a five-time Tony Award nominee and two-time Drama Desk Award winner. In a career spanning over thirty years, Maxwell was one of the most celebrated and critically acclaimed stage actresses of her time.

Maxwell made her Broadway debut in 1989, as an understudy in the musical City of Angels. She received her first Tony nomination in 2005 for the musical Chitty Chitty Bang Bang. Her other nominations were for Coram Boy in 2007, Lend Me a Tenor and The Royal Family both in 2010, and Follies in 2012.

Her nominations in two separate Tony Award categories in 2010, made her only the fourth actress to achieve two nominations in a single year. Her 2012 nomination for Follies made her only the second actress to receive a Tony nomination in all four acting categories. Her other Broadway credits include Dancing at Lughnasa (1992), A Doll's House (1997), The Sound of Music (1998) and The Dinner Party (2001).

Maxwell appeared in films and television shows such as I Am Michael with James Franco, Neil LaBute's Billy and Billie (2014–15), The Divide (2014), The Good Wife (2014), and Gossip Girl (2009–2011). From 1994-2003, she appeared in four episodes of the NBC drama Law & Order, each time as a different character. She also appeared in season 3 of Madam Secretary in 2016.

Early life
Maxwell was born in Fargo, North Dakota, as the fifth of six children to former First District Judge, Ralph B. Maxwell, who served in North Dakota from 1967 to 1978, and his wife, Elizabeth "Liz" Maxwell (née Fargusson; 1926–2015), later a lawyer for the EPA. She attended West Fargo High School, West Fargo, North Dakota, University of Utah, and Moorhead State University.

She played the lead role as Calamity Jane in her 1973 High School play Deadwood Dick.

Career
Maxwell made her Broadway debut as an understudy in the Cy Coleman – David Zippel musical City of Angels in 1989. She eventually took over the dual roles of Carla Haywood and Alaura Kingsley.

She appeared in Brian Friel's Dancing at Lughnasa in 1992, which won the Tony Award for Best Play. She replaced original cast member Brid Brennan in the role of Agnes. In 1997, she appeared in A Doll's House opposite Janet McTeer. In 1998, she played Elsa Schraeder in the first Broadway revival of Rodgers and Hammerstein's The Sound of Music.  She then starred opposite John Ritter and Henry Winkler in Neil Simon's The Dinner Party in 2000  and in Sixteen Wounded in 2004 with Judd Hirsch and Martha Plimpton.  On television during this time, between 1994 and 2003, she made four guest appearances in the long-running NBC crime drama Law & Order, each time as a different character.

In 2005, she received a Tony Award nomination for Best Featured Actress in a Musical, for the role of Baroness Bomburst in the stage production of Chitty Chitty Bang Bang. She also won the Drama Desk Award for this role. In 2006, she starred in Roundabout Theatre Company's Off-Broadway revival of Joe Orton's Entertaining Mr. Sloane for which she received a Drama Desk nomination for Best Actress. Also in 2006, she reunited with her Sound of Music co-star Richard Chamberlain in Hawaii Opera Theatre's production of Rodgers and Hammerstein's The King and I in Honolulu, Hawaii. In 2007, she starred as Mrs. Lynch in the Broadway production of Helen Edmundson's Coram Boy at the Imperial Theatre, for which she received her second Tony Award nomination, for Best Featured Actress in a Play, as well as another Drama Desk Award nomination for Outstanding Featured Actress in a Play.

Her Off-Broadway and regional credits include performances in The Seagull at the John F. Kennedy Center for the Performing Arts in 1985, in House & Garden at the Manhattan Theatre Club in 2002, in A Bad Friend at the Newhouse Theater, Lincoln Center in 2003 and at Carnegie Hall in the Stephen Sondheim concert, Opening Doors, in 2004.

In 2008 she appeared Off-Broadway with the Potomac Theatre Project/NYC in Howard Barker's Scenes from an Execution and was nominated for a Drama Desk and NYITT award.  In 2008, Maxwell appeared on Broadway in the Manhattan Theater Club production of To Be or Not to Be in the role of Maria Tura at the Friedman Theatre.

She appeared as Julie Cavendish in the Broadway revival of The Royal Family at the Samuel J. Friedman Theatre in late 2009. For this role she won the 2010 Drama Desk Award for Outstanding Actress in a Play. Maxwell starred as Maria in the Broadway revival of Lend Me a Tenor, which began performances at the Music Box Theatre on March 11, 2010.

She won the Outer Critics Circle Award as Outstanding Featured Actress in a Play for this role. Maxwell received two 2010 Tony Award nominations: one for her leading role in The Royal Family in 2009 and another for her featured role  in Lend Me a Tenor in 2010. She is only the fourth actress to receive double nominations in a single year.

Maxwell played the role of Phyllis Rogers Stone in the Kennedy Center production of the Stephen Sondheim–James Goldman musical Follies, running from May 7 to June 19, 2011, at the Eisenhower Theater in Washington, DC. Her co-stars were Bernadette Peters, Elaine Paige, Ron Raines and Danny Burstein. She reprised her role in the Broadway limited engagement at the Marquis Theatre, which ran from August 7, 2011 (previews) through January 22, 2012.  On October 29, 2011, after the Saturday matinee, Maxwell was hit by a minivan, suffering injuries to her arm and leg, fracturing her fibula. She missed the following two shows, but was back a few days later. Maxwell received Helen Hayes, Fred Astaire, Drama League, Outer Critics Circle, Drama Desk and Tony Award nominations for Best Leading Actress in a Musical for this role. The Tony nomination (her fifth) made her only the second actress to receive nominations in all  four acting categories; the first was Angela Lansbury. Maxwell reprised her role in this production's transfer to the Ahmanson Theatre in Los Angeles, California from May 3 to June 9, 2012.

She appeared in the PTP/NYC (The Potomac Theatre Project) Off-Broadway production of the Howard Barker play Victory: Choices in Reaction, in a limited engagement in July 2011. In 2013, Maxwell played the role of Skinner in Howard Barker's The Castle: A Triumph with PTP/NYC at the Atlantic Theatre, Stage 2. She appeared in the Off-Broadway production of the Anthony Giardina play, The City of Conversation at the Lincoln Center Mitzi Newhouse Theater, from May 5, 2014, to July 26, 2014. She was nominated for the 2015 Lucille Lortel Award, Outstanding Actress in a Play, the 2015 Outer Critics Circle Award, Outstanding Actress in a Play, the 2015 Drama Desk Award, Best Actress in a Play and 2015 Drama League Award, Distinguished Performance Award. In an interview with Time Out New York in July 2016, Maxwell announced that she was retiring from theatre after the run of her second production of Scenes from an Execution then in rehearsal.

She was also a voice actress and read several audio books, including Mary Higgins Clark's Two Little Girls in Blue and No Place Like Home.

Maxwell starred as a "scheming Senator" in the CBS TV series BrainDead alongside Mary Elizabeth Winstead, Aaron Tveit and Tony Shalhoub, which aired from June to September 2016.

Personal life and death
Maxwell was married to actor and playwright Robert Emmet Lunney, and they had a son William "Will" Maxwell-Lunney.

Maxwell died on February 11, 2018, from leptomeningeal carcinomatosis complicated from breast cancer at her Manhattan apartment at the age of 61.

Awards and nominations

Stage

References

External links
 
 
 
 Career listing at American Theatre Wing

1956 births
2018 deaths
Deaths from cancer in New York (state)
Deaths from breast cancer
American stage actresses
American television actresses
American musical theatre actresses
American women singers
Drama Desk Award winners
Actresses from North Dakota
People from West Fargo, North Dakota
Minnesota State University Moorhead alumni
20th-century American actresses
21st-century American actresses
University of Utah alumni